= Upholstery (band) =

US musical group

- Origin: Philadelphia, Pennsylvania
- Genres: Rock
- Years active: 2007–present
- Members: Jeremy Prouty; Corey Mark; John Wilder; Dorie Byrne; Kate Black-Regan; C.W. Kennedy; Rachel Icenogle
- Past members: Alison Conard; Johnny DeBlase; Sam Allingham; Jason Carr; Justin Gibbon; Dawn Webster; Daby Byrne

Upholstery is an American music collective based in Philadelphia, Pennsylvania. Formed in 2007, the group's musical style is a blend of early and mid-20th century American genres, including blues, swing, and rhythm and blues mixed with elements of math rock, jazz, and chamber music.

The band's discography consists of studio-produced concept albums, as well as musical selections from its telenovela-theater alter-ego, Señor Papos. Upholstery’s live performances have theatrical stagecraft and puppetry.

== History ==
=== Formation ===
Upholstery was first established in 2007 as a moniker for Jeremy Prouty's collaborative project. Brought together to record the full-length album New Platitudes in 2008, the group initially consisted of a rotating cast of players, with Prouty acting as songwriter and conceptual lead. Alison Conard provided instrumental and vocal backing, as well as sound engineering, mixing, and production support.

In 2009, Prouty assembled a new configuration of musicians under the Upholstery umbrella to create the live score for C.W. Kennedy's Philadelphia Fringe Festival production Rails.

After a series of shows following the release of Upholstery's first album, Prouty and Conard began production on a second, Clydesdales & Tardigrades. That year, drummer Corey Mark, who had contributed to the first album, returned. Upon the completion of album production in late 2010, John Wilder joined in preparation for the record's release in early 2011. Conard stepped away from the project following the completion of Clydesdales & Tardigrades.

Multi-instrumentalist Dorie Byrne joined to play accordion. Soon after, Byrne shifted to keyboard duties as Upholstery scored and later performed music for C.W. Kennedy's theater production Water Bears in Space!, which was hailed as a standout production of the 2011 Philadelphia Fringe Festival.

=== Señor Papos ===
As a side project, Kennedy and Prouty created the satirical stage personalities Señor Herequeque Papos and Jota Miraflores, caricatures of Spanish cultural stereotypes to be performed in drag as a musical theatre series in the style of telenovelas.

== Recent activity ==
In late 2012, Prouty began assembling songs for Upholstery's next album, and in early 2013, he produced a selection of demos for Running the Badwater. At this time, Kate Black-Regan joined the group as a lead vocalist.

In the following months, the new five-piece configuration of the band began pre-production for a full-length album, the first for which Prouty did not write all lyrics and songs. The group partnered with the sound engineers of the Sex Dungeon to produce Running the Badwater, a full-length record released in late 2013.

== Band members ==
=== Current members ===
- Jeremy Prouty – vocals, guitar, bass (2007–present)
- Corey Mark – drums (2007–2018)
- John Wilder – bass, gusto (2010–2014, 2017–present)
- Dorie Byrne – accordion, trombone, flute, vocals (2011–present)
- Kate Black-Regan – vocals (2013–2015, 2017–present)
- C.W. Kennedy – violin, vocals (2014–present)
- Rachel Icenogle – cello (2015–present)

=== Frequent guests ===
- Sean McPhee – audio and video production (2011–present)
- David Fishkin – tenor sax (2007–present)
- Dan Blacksberg – trombone (2007–present)
- Kevin James Holland – vocals (2009–present)
- Martin Gottlieb-Hollis – trumpet (member 2013–2016, guest 2017–present)
- Nick Millevoi – guitar (2014–present)

=== Past members ===
- Alison Conard – keys, guitar, vocals, sound engineering, production (2007–2014)
- Johnny DeBlase – bass (2007–2008)
- Sam Allingham – bass (2015–2016)
- Jason Carr – synthesizer
- Justin Gibbon – drums
- Dawn Webster – trumpet
- Daby Byrne – baritone sax, electronic noise

== Discography ==
=== Albums ===
- 6 New Platitudes (2008)
- Clydesdales and Tardigrades (2011)
- Running the Badwater (2014)

=== EPs ===
- Muchos Detalles, Pocos Hechos (2011)
- Running the Badwater [the demos] (2013)
- Papos Does Pop! (2015)

=== Compilations ===
- Rails (2009)
- Live in Eleven (2011)
- Water Bears in Space! (2011)

== Theatrical scores ==
- Rails (2009)
- Water Bears In Space (2011)
- Jug Baby (2014)
- A Porch at the Edge of the World (2015)
